Jeļena Ostapenko was the defending champion, but lost in the second round to Ekaterina Alexandrova.

Kiki Bertens won the title, defeating Ajla Tomljanović in the final, 7–6(7–2), 4–6, 6–2.

This tournament was the last in Agnieszka Radwańska's career. The former world No. 2 played the final match of her professional career in the second round, when she lost to Irina-Camelia Begu in straight sets.

Seeds

Draw

Finals

Top half

Bottom half

Qualifying

Seeds

Qualifiers

Qualifying draw

First qualifier

Second qualifier

Third qualifier

Fourth qualifier

Fifth qualifier

Sixth qualifier

External links
Main draw
Qualifying draw

Korea Open - Singles
2018 Singles
2018 Korea Open